Ain’t Too Proud: The Life and Times of The Temptations is a 2018 jukebox musical with music and lyrics by The Temptations and a book by Dominique Morisseau. Based on the story of The Temptations, the musical had a series of regional productions and opened at Broadway’s Imperial Theatre in March 2019.

Productions

Berkeley Rep (2017)
The musical premiered at the Berkeley Repertory Theatre in Berkeley, California, on August 31, 2017, with a press opening on September 14, for a limited engagement until November 5, 2017. The production was directed by Des McAnuff and choreographed by Sergio Trujillo. The production’s design team included scenery by Robert Brill, costumes by Paul Tazewell, lighting by Howell Binkley, sound by Steve Canyon Kennedy, and projections by Peter Nigrini. The musical was originally set to play through October 8; but was later extended through October 22; and ultimately through November 5. The musical was the highest-grossing production in the theatre’s history.

Washington, DC (2018)
Following its run at Berkeley Rep, the show moved to the Kennedy Center in Washington, DC where it ran from June 19, 2018 through July 22, 2018.

Los Angeles (2018)
Following its run at the Kennedy Center, the show moved to the Ahmanson Theatre in Los Angeles, California where it ran from August 21, 2018 through September 30, 2018.

Toronto (2018)
Following its run at the Ahmanson, the show moved to the Princess of Wales Theatre in Toronto, Ontario where it ran from October 11, 2018 through November 17, 2018.

Broadway (2019)

The musical opened on Broadway in 2019 at the Imperial Theatre, with previews beginning February 28, 2019 and an opening night on March 21, 2019. As of March 12, 2020, the show suspended production due to the COVID-19 pandemic. On May 10, 2021, it was announced that the show would return to Broadway with a gala performance on October 16. The production had its final performance on January 16, 2022.

US Tour (2021)
It was announced on May 31, 2019 that the national tour would kick off in July 2020 at the Providence Performing Arts Center in Providence, Rhode Island. The premiere was postponed due to the COVID-19 pandemic. It opened at the Durham Performing Arts Center in Durham, North Carolina on December 7, 2021.

West End (2023) 
A production will begin performances in the West End at the Prince Edward Theatre on March 31, 2023.

Characters and original cast

Musical numbers

Original Berkeley Rep production 

"Ain't Too Proud to Beg"
"All I Need"
"Baby Love"
"Ball of Confusion (That's What the World is Today)"
"Cloud Nine"
"Come See About Me"
"Don't Look Back"
"For Once in My Life"
"Get Ready"
"Gloria"
"I Can't Get Next to You"
"I Could Never Love Another (After Loving You)"
"(I Know) I'm Losing You"
"I Want a Love I Can See"
"I Wish It Would Rain"
"If You Don’t Know Me by Now"

"I’m Gonna Make You Love Me"
"In the Still of the Night"
"Just My Imagination (Running Away with Me)"
"My Girl"
"Papa Was a Rollin' Stone"
"Runaway Child, Running Wild"
"Shout"
"Since I Lost My Baby"
"Speedo"
"Superstar (Remember How You Got Where You Are)"
"The Way You Do the Things You Do"
"War"
"What Becomes of the Brokenhearted"
"You Can’t Hurry Love"
"You're My Everything"

Original Broadway production 

 Act I
 "The Way You Do The Things You Do"
 "Runaway Child, Running Wild"
 "Gloria"
 "In The Still Of The Night"/"Speedo"
 "Shout"
 "I Want A Love I Can See"
 "My Girl"
 "Get Ready"
 Supremes Medley: "You Can't Hurry Love"/"Come See About Me"/"Baby Love"
 "Since I Lost My Baby   "                             
 "Ain't Too Proud To Beg"
 "Don't Look Back"/"You're My Everything"
 "If I Could Build My Whole World Around You"
 "If You Don't Know Me By Now"
 "(I Know) I'm Losing You"
 "I Wish It Would Rain"
 "I Could Never Love Another (After Loving You)"

 Act II
 "I Can't Get Next To You"                            
 "I'm Gonna Make You Love Me"
 "War"
 "Ball Of Confusion (That's What The World Is Today)"
 "Just My Imagination (Running Away With Me)"
 "Superstar (Remember How You Got Where You Are)"
 "For Once In My Life"
 "Papa Was A Rollin' Stone", Pt. 1
 "Cloud Nine"
 "Papa Was A Rollin' Stone", Pt. 2                
 "What Becomes Of The Brokenhearted"
 "I Can't Get Next To You"

Recording
The original Broadway cast recording of Ain't Too Proud was recorded January 19–22, 2019 at Sound on Sound Studios, Montclair, NJ, and digitally released on March 22, 2019. The physical album released on April 19, and a double-LP vinyl was released on June 7.

Awards and nominations

Broadway production

References

External links
Internet Broadway Database

2017 musicals
American rock musicals
Broadway musicals
Jukebox musicals
Musicals inspired by real-life events
Plays set in the 1960s
Plays set in the 1970s
Cultural depictions of soul musicians
Plays set in the United States
The Temptations
Tony Award-winning musicals